= Bagawad =

Coordinates: 23°43′N 76°10′E

- Village
- Interactive map of Bagawad
- Country: India
- State: Karnataka
- District: Dharwad

Government
  - Body: Village Panchayat

Population (2011)
  - Total: 470

Languages
  - Official: Kannada
- Time zone: UTC+5:30 (IST)
- ISO 3166 code: IN-KA
- Vehicle registration: KA
- Website: karnataka.gov.in

Bagawad is a village in Dharwad district of Karnataka, India.

== Demographics ==
As of the 2011 Census of India there were 103 households in Bagawad and a total population of 470 consisting of 238 males and 232 females. There were 57 children ages 0–6.
